John Melvin Bryan Jr. (October 7, 1912 – January 8, 1992) was a Canadian politician and son of printer and politician John Melvin Bryan Sr. He served in the Legislative Assembly of British Columbia from 1956 to 1960, as a Social Credit member for the constituency of North Vancouver.

References

British Columbia Social Credit Party MLAs
1912 births
1992 deaths
Politicians from Vancouver